The discography of Japanese contemporary R&B singer Crystal Kay consists of 12 studio albums, three extended plays, five compilation albums, four video albums and numerous single releases. Crystal Kay debuted as a singer at 13 years of age in 1999 under Epic Records Japan. Her third album Almost Seventeen (2002) saw a great leap in popularity for Crystal Kay, reaching number two on Oricon's albums chart. In 2005, Cyrystal Kay sung the eponymous theme song for the Tsuyoshi Kusanagi drama Koi ni Ochitara: Boku no Seikō no Himitsu. "Koi ni Ochitara" became Crystal Kay's most successful single, being certified for a million ringtone downloads.

In 2011, Crystal Kay signed to Delicious Deli Records, after 11 years with Epic Records, and released the album Vivid (2012). In March 2013 Crystal Kay relocated to New York City to pursue an American debut through Copetin Inc, releasing the single "Busy Doing Nothing" a year later. In October 2014, Crystal Kay re-focused on Japan by switching her management to LDH.

Studio albums

Extended plays

Compilation albums

Cover albums

Soundtrack albums

Singles

As a lead artist

As a featured artist

Promotional singles

Other appearances

Video albums

Notes

References

Discographies of Japanese artists
Pop music discographies
Rhythm and blues discographies